The Korean People's Army Strategic Force (Korean: 조선인민군 전략군,Hancha:朝鮮人民軍 戰略軍), previously known as the Korean People's Army Strategic Rocket Force (Korean: 조선인민군 전략로케트군,Hancha:朝鮮人民軍 戰略로케트軍) and as the Missile Guidance Bureau (Korean: 미사일지도국,Hancha:미사일指導局), is a military branch of the Korean People's Army that oversees North Korea's nuclear and conventional strategic missiles. It is mainly armed with surface-to-surface missiles of domestic design as well as older Soviet and Chinese models. The KPA Strategic Force was established in 1999 when several missile units under KPA Ground Force Artillery Command were re-organized into a single missile force reporting directly to the office of the Supreme Commander of the KPA via the General Staff.

History
Shortly after Kim Il-Sung's 5 October 1966 instructions to jointly develop the military and the economy, the Second Machine Industry Ministry, under the Workers' Party of Korea secretary in charge of military defence industries was formed to regulate the procurement and production of weapons.

Some sources assert that North Korea had begun the production of multiple rocket launchers in the early 1960s. It might be logically assumed that by 1965,  Kim Il-Sung had probably made the political decision to establish an indigenous missile production capability, after the Soviet Union could not produce a suitable ballistic missiles arrangement to favor his request.

Nevertheless, during the 1960s the Soviet Union began to provide free rockets over ground (FROGs), surface-to-air missiles (SAMs), and coastal defense antiship missiles, which provided North Korean engineers groundwork technologies for rocket propulsion, guidance, and related missile systems. In 1965, North Korea founded the Hamhŭng Military Academy to train North Korean defence personnel in rocket and missile research and development. By 1970, North Korea had procured surface-to-ship missiles and surface-to-air missiles from China. North Korea also sought assistance to establish its own independent sovereign missile defence development program.

In September 1971, North Korea signed a defence agreement with China to procure, develop, and produce ballistic missiles. Around 1977 final details for bilateral cooperation grew when North Korean engineers participated in a joint development program for the DF-61. The DF-61 was ideally to be a liquid-fueled ballistic missile with a range of about 600 km and a 1,000 kg warhead. The program was cancelled in 1978 because of Chinese domestic political opinions.

Around this same time, North Korea was also seeking Soviet missiles and technology. North Korea procured Soviet-made Scud-B ballistic missiles. The timing of the acquisition is unclear. One North Korean defector asserted that the Soviet Union provided about 20 Scud-Bs in 1972. This claim has not been substantiated and is probably not credible.

By 1984, North Korea had produced and flight-tested its Hwasong-5, which reportedly has a range of 320 km compared to the Scud-B's 300 km; the extra 20 km is attributed to improvements in the missile's propulsion system and not a reduction in the mass of the warhead. Just as North Korea was beginning to manufacture the Hwasŏng-5, Iran approached North Korea in 1985 to purchase the missile for use in the “war of the cities” with Iraq. North Korea began to construct missile bases for the Hwasŏng-5 around 1985-86, just before the missile went into serial production around 1987. North Korea's ballistic missile development then accelerated at a fast pace; as soon as mass production of the Hwasŏng-5 began, North Korea began developing the Hwasŏng-6 (火星-6 or Scud-C), the Rodong (commonly known as Nodong-1), the Paektusan-1 (白頭山-1; commonly known as the Taepodong-1), the Paektusan-2 (白頭山-2; commonly known as the Taepodong-2), and the Musudan.

Despite the difficulties of missile development and the fact that other countries had tried and failed to develop medium- and intermediate-range missiles, North Korea began to produce Rodong prototypes around the same time it was beginning mass production of the Hwasŏng-6 (Scud-C). The first Rodong deployments were in February 1995, even though the system only had two flight tests—one catastrophic failure and one successful flight at a reduced range. In 1999 different missile units, which were subordinate to the KPA Ground Force Artillery Command, were re-organized into a single missile force - the Missile Guidance Bureau. It would be only in 2012 when Kim Jong-un referred to the service as the Strategic Rocket Forces during his commemorative address honoring the centennial year of Kim Il-sung's birth.

Since Kim Jong-un came to power in December 2011, North Korea has attempted to launch nearly three times as many ballistic missiles as during the entire reign of his father, Kim Jong-il. Between 2011 and the end of 2016, North Korea launched a total of 42 ballistic missiles: 20 short-range Scud- type missiles with a range of 300-1,000 km, 10 medium-range No Dong missiles that can fly 1,300-1,500 km, eight intermediate-range Hwasong 10 (Musudan) missiles traditionally assessed to have a range of 3,500-4,000 km, and four submarine-launched ballistic missiles (SLBMs). These tests can be divided into three categories:  tests of operational missiles,  tests of missiles North Korea considered operational but were untested  (such as the Musudan),  and those still under development (such as the Pukkuksong [Polaris] family of solid-fuelled missiles).

In 2012 the United Nations and independent experts said that North Korea did not operate missiles beyond the intermediate range, and that the long-range missiles shown at parades are mock-ups. There were doubts about the authenticity of the KN-08 missiles displayed on 16-wheel carrier trucks during a 2012 military parade, and the Musudan missiles shown in 2010.

The testing in 2018 and 2019 of four new road-mobile, solid propellant propulsion, SRBMs marked a qualitative improvement in North Korean missiles. These have a reduced firing preparation signature making destruction before launch more difficult, and some have a flattened trajectory making in-flight interception more difficult. Japanese Defence Minister Takeshi Iwaya stated "I believe that [North Korea’s] development of a missile that flies at a lower altitude than a conventional ballistic missile in an irregular trajectory is aimed at breaking through the [Japanese] missile defence system". These new missiles such as the KN-23 and KN-24 are more sophisticated than the previous Hwasong series. They employ flattened trajectories to remain below 50 km in altitude, putting them in between the 40 km maximum engagement altitude of Patriot missile-defense interceptors and 50 km minimum engagement altitude of THAAD and Aegis missile defense systems. Flying through this coverage gap and using active steering increases survivability against missile defenses. They also have the advantage of being solid-fueled and more accurate than their predecessors, making them more effective weapons.

Between 2018 and 2020, North Korea expanded its missiles brigades from 8 to 13.

Organization
The Strategic Force is a branch of the KPA, and is directly subordinate to the supreme commander.

Facilities

 Musudan-ri is a rocket launching site in North Korea at 40°51′N, 129°40′E. It lies in southern North Hamgyong Province, near the northern tip of East Korea Bay. The area was formerly known as Taep'o-dong (대포동), from which the Taepodong rockets take their name.
 Kittaeryŏng(깃대령) site is in Kangwon Province, which borders South Korea. It is used for launches of short to medium-range missiles and has a pad for mobile launchers.
 Kalgol-dong(갈골동) site is in Chagang Province and houses Hwasong-5/6 missiles, targeting South Korea.
 Panghyon Airport site is in North P'yongan Province and houses Rodong missiles. It targets U.S. forces in Japan.
 Okp’yŏng-dong(옥평동) site is in Kangwon Province and houses Hwasong and Rodong missiles.
 Pongdong-ri(봉동리) site is on North Korea's west coast, about 50 km south of the North Korean-Chinese border.
 Sakkanmol Missile Operating Base is a short-range ballistic missiles site in North Hwanghae Province.
Chia-ri(지하리) north of Chorwon County, Kangwon Province, it is a missile support facility and operational launch base.
Kumchon-ni(금천리) in Anbyon County, it is equipped with Hwasong-9 (Scud-ER) medium-range ballistic missiles (MRBM). 
Sing'ye (Shin'gye)(신계) across from Chia-ri, this is a small missile support facility and SCUD-C base. Construction began in 1985.
Sil-li(신리) a missile support facility next to Pyongyang International Airport constructed between 2016-2020.  
Hodo Peninsula(호도반도) is a rocket and missile testing facility near Wonsan. It was established in the 1960s and was modernized in 2014–2016.
Yusang-ni(유상리) Twenty-eight kilometers east of Sunchon, it is one of the newest operating bases built (c. 2003). It has been reported to house either the Hwasong-13, Hwasong-14, or Hwasong-15 missiles.
Hoejung-ni(회정리) is North Korea's newest missile base, built c. 2012–13. It is likely capable of deploying intercontinental ballistic missiles as it lies in the country's missile "strategic belt".
Riman-ri (Yongnim)(리만리) it is south of Chonchon County, Chagang Province and is the largest missile base by area.
Sangnam-ri(상남리) in South Hamgyong Province, it is equipped with intermediate-range ballistic missiles.
Sinpo-Mayang the site is a submarine base and SLBM development facility
Sino-ri(신오리) the site houses a regiment-sized unit equipped with Nodong-1 medium-range ballistic missiles.
Taegwan(대관) is the home of a missile base and a nearby missile manufacturing facility.
Yeongjeo-dong(영저동) the site is near the Chinese border in Ryanggang Province.
Magun'po(마군포) is a solid rocket motor test facility.
Chamjin-ni(잠진리) is North Korea's oldest known vertical engine test stand.

There are other numerous smaller sites, scattered around the country, serving for mobile launcher pads. Some larger sites are under construction.

Launch capabilities
 Silo-based launch:
South Korean government sources are reported to have stated in 2013 that a missile silo complex is located south of Paektu Mountain near the Chinese border. The silos are reportedly designed for mid- to long-range missiles, but it is not clear if all of them are operational; however, these claims have not been independently verified.

 Launch pads:
Launching pads are required for the more sophisticated Taepodong-1/2, as their liquid propellant is difficult to store and the missiles must be fueled immediately before launch. This launching method poses a great risk, as the sites themselves are extremely vulnerable to airstrikes. Launching pads can be used to test different types of SRBM, IRBM and ICBMs, and to launch space satellites, but they are of little value if any of these missiles is to be deployed as a strategic weapon.

 Mobile launcher vehicles:
North Korea extensively uses mobile launchers for its missiles, including the Rodong-1 and the Hwasong-10. These are hard to detect and significantly improve survivability.

 Submarine/ship-based launch:
The Korean People's Navy is not known to have ballistic missile submarines in service. However, it has started research and development into a capability to launch ballistic missiles from submarines and has successfully fired a missile from one of its test submarines.

Active missiles
Detailed listings of the equipment holdings of the Korean People's Army are rather scarce in unclassified literature. North Korea operates the FROG-7, Hwasong-5 (Locally built Scud-B), Hwasong-6 (Locally built Scud-C), Hwasong-9 ( Scud-ER) and Hwasong-7 (mislabeled as Rodong-1) The U.S. National Air and Space Intelligence Center reported in 2009 that the Rocket Forces had fewer than 100 launchers for Tochka and Hwasong-5/6 SRBMs, and fewer than 50 launchers for the Hwasong-7. Academic research in 2015 suggested North Korea had about 1,000 ballistic missiles: 600 Hwasong-series; 100 KN-02s; and 300 Hwasong-7s.

As of 2016, South Korea's military has identified three belts of North Korean missiles, with the first located about 50–90 km north of the Korean Demilitarized Zone (DMZ). This belt reportedly has 500-600 Scud missiles that have ranges of 300–700 km. It said the North has some 40 transporter erector launchers (TELs) in this belt, which makes the missiles harder to detect. In the second belt lying 90–120 km north of the DMZ, Pyongyang is known to have placed 200-300 No Dong (also called Rodong) medium-range missiles with a range of around 1,300 km with 30 TELs. In the third belt lying deeper inside the country, the North may have 30-50 Musudan (Hwasong-10) intermediate-range ballistic missiles (IRBMs) and 30 TELs, with the latest reports indicating the deployment of the North's KN-08 long-range missiles.

As of 2017, North Korea is thought to possess about 900 short-range ballistic missiles (SRBMs).

Rather speculative estimates are given in the following table:

Warheads
North Korean missiles can serve to deliver various types of warheads, including WMD. It is possible that up to three Rodong-1 missiles are fitted with nuclear warheads. In a similar manner to the initial Chinese nuclear doctrine, nuclear weapons are being stored separately, and would only be mounted on missiles after an order of the supreme commander (Kim Jong-un). Despite the claims by numerous media that North Korea has not yet created nuclear warheads small enough to be fit in a missile, reports surfaced in April 2009, according to which North Korea has miniaturized warheads, capable of being mounted on its missiles. The most suitable nuclear weapons delivery system is the Rodong-1, which has been successfully tested many times.

Additionally, North Korea possesses a large chemical weapons stockpile, including powerful agents such as tabun, sarin, soman, VX gas and others. Little is known about the biological weapons stockpiles. They are probably limited, as North Koreans consider them much more dangerous to handle, therefore posing a threat to their own soldiers apart from the enemy.

North Korea has yet to demonstrate the ability to produce a re-entry vehicle, without which North Korea cannot deliver a weapon accurately from an ICBM. However a crude and highly-inaccurate blunt body reentry vehicle could be used in early missiles.

North Korea has been upgrading warheads for their Scud-derived ballistic missiles with maneuverable reentry vehicle capability in order to increase accuracy and introduce capability of evasion of ballistic missile defence system's such as THAAD.

Exports

Several countries, including Egypt, Vietnam, Iran, Libya, Pakistan, Syria, the United Arab Emirates (UAE) and Yemen, have bought North Korean ballistic missiles or components, or received assistance from North Korea to establish local missile production.

See also
North Korea and weapons of mass destruction
North Korean missile tests
List of states with nuclear weapons

References

Citations

Sources 

 Reuters - A look at North Korea's missile arsenal
 Bermudez, Joseph S. (2001). Shield of the Great Leader. The Armed Forces of North Korea, The Armed Forces of Asia. Sydney: Allen & Unwin. .
 Homer T. Hodge, North Korea's Military Strategy, Parameters (journal), Spring 2003, pp. 68–81
 The International Institute for Strategic Studies (IISS) (2007). The Military Balance 2007. Abingdon: Routledge Journals. .
 Bermudez, Joseph S. (1999). "A History of Ballistic Missile Development in the DPRK: First Ballistic Missiles, 1979-1989".
 James Martin Center for Nonproliferation Studies.
 Zaloga, Steven; Illustrated by Jim Laurier and Lee Ray (2006). Scud Ballistic Missile Launch Systems 1955-2005. Osprey Publishing. .

Further reading

External links 
 KPA Equipment Holdings
 CIA World Factbook
 FAS
 Profile of Frog-7  published by the United States Army Center of Military History

 
Strategic forces